A bandage is a medical treatment.

Bandage or Bandages may also refer to:
 Adhesive bandage, a bandage used to stick on the skin
 Bandage (film), a 2010 Japanese film
 "Bandage" (song) a song by Lands
 Bandages (album), by the Edgar Broughton Band
 "Bandages" (song), by Hot Hot Heat

See also